Rangin Ban (also Romanized as Rangīn Bān; also known as Rangīnābād) is a village in Jelogir Rural District, in the Central District of Pol-e Dokhtar County, Lorestan Province, Iran. At the 2006 census, its population was 284, in 59 families.

References 

Towns and villages in Pol-e Dokhtar County